Vladimir Nikolaevich Shadrin (6 June 1948 – 26 August 2021) was an ice hockey centre who played in the Soviet Hockey League from 1964 to 1979 for HC Spartak Moscow. He also played in the Japan Ice Hockey League for Oji Seishi between 1979 and 1983. He was inducted into the Russian and Soviet Hockey Hall of Fame in 1971.

Biography
Shadrin won three Soviet League championships with Spartak Moscow (1967, 1969, 1976). On the international level, Shadrin won two Olympic gold medals and five World Championship titles. He was one of the stars on the Soviet team that played Team Canada in the famous 1972 Summit Series. During this series he finished second in team scoring, behind Alexander Yakushev, with three goals and five assists for eight points. 

Shadrin, who had cancer, died on 26 August 2021, after contracting COVID-19. He was 73.

References

External links
 Soviet Hockey Hall of Fame page

1948 births
2021 deaths
HC Spartak Moscow players
Honoured Masters of Sport of the USSR
Ice hockey players at the 1972 Winter Olympics
Ice hockey players at the 1976 Winter Olympics
Medalists at the 1972 Winter Olympics
Medalists at the 1976 Winter Olympics
Oji Eagles players
Olympic gold medalists for the Soviet Union
Olympic ice hockey players of the Soviet Union
Olympic medalists in ice hockey
Soviet expatriate ice hockey players
Soviet ice hockey centres
Ice hockey people from Moscow
Russian State University of Physical Education, Sport, Youth and Tourism alumni
Soviet ice hockey coaches
Russian ice hockey coaches
Recipients of the Order of Honour (Russia)
Deaths from the COVID-19 pandemic in Russia
Soviet expatriates in Japan